This article is about the particular significance of the year 1884 to Wales and its people.

Incumbents

Archdruid of the National Eisteddfod of Wales – Clwydfardd

Lord Lieutenant of Anglesey – William Owen Stanley 
Lord Lieutenant of Brecknockshire – Joseph Bailey, 1st Baron Glanusk
Lord Lieutenant of Caernarvonshire – Edward Douglas-Pennant, 1st Baron Penrhyn 
Lord Lieutenant of Cardiganshire – Edward Pryse
Lord Lieutenant of Carmarthenshire – John Campbell, 2nd Earl Cawdor 
Lord Lieutenant of Denbighshire – William Cornwallis-West  
Lord Lieutenant of Flintshire – Hugh Robert Hughes
Lord Lieutenant of Glamorgan – Christopher Rice Mansel Talbot 
Lord Lieutenant of Merionethshire – Edward Lloyd-Mostyn, 2nd Baron Mostyn (until 17 March) Robert Davies Pryce (from 17 May)
Lord Lieutenant of Monmouthshire – Henry Somerset, 8th Duke of Beaufort
Lord Lieutenant of Montgomeryshire – Edward Herbert, 3rd Earl of Powis
Lord Lieutenant of Pembrokeshire – William Edwardes, 4th Baron Kensington
Lord Lieutenant of Radnorshire – Arthur Walsh, 2nd Baron Ormathwaite 

Bishop of Bangor – James Colquhoun Campbell
Bishop of Llandaff – Richard Lewis (from 25 April)
Bishop of St Asaph – Joshua Hughes 
Bishop of St Davids – Basil Jones

Events
18 January – Physician William Price attempts to cremate his son, Iesu Grist (died 10 January aged 5 months), at Llantrisant. Later tried at Cardiff Assizes and acquitted on the grounds that cremation is not contrary to law, he is thus able to carry out the ceremony (the first in the U.K. in modern times) on 14 March.
27 January – 14 miners are killed in an accident at the Naval Colliery, Penygraig.
4 March – A Royal Commission on the Housing of the Working Classes is established. The Prince of Wales accepts nomination to the Commission and offends protocol by trying to have Octavia Hill included as a member.
18 October – Opening of the University College of North Wales, Bangor in the former Penrhyn Arms Hotel.
22 October – The Argentine Congress authorises the construction of the Central Chubut Railway by Lewis Jones y Cia.
8 November – 15 miners are killed in an accident at the Pochin Colliery, Tredegar.
unknown dates
Isolation hospital for cholera patients opens on Flat Holm.
A Chair of Celtic Studies is founded at the University College of South Wales, Cardiff.
Closure of Talargoch lead mine, near Dyserth.
Slate industry in Wales: A flood at Dorothea quarry in the Nantlle Valley kills 7 and there is a major rockfall in the underground Cwmorthin quarry in the Blaenau Ffestiniog district.

Arts and literature

Awards
National Eisteddfod of Wales – held at Liverpool
Chair – Evan Rees ("Dyfed"), "Gwilym Hiraethog"
Crown – Edward Foulkes

New books
Amy Dillwyn – Jill
Robert Owen – Institutes of Canon Law

Music
Joseph Parry – Nebuchadnezzar (cantata)

Sport
Football – Oswestry win the Welsh Cup for the first time.
Rugby union – The first international match is played at Cardiff Arms Park (between Wales and Ireland).

Births
9 January – William Llewellyn Morgan, Wales international rugby union player (died 1960)
19 February – Clement Davies, politician, leader of the Liberal Party (UK) (died 1962)
6 April – J. G. Parry-Thomas, engineer and racing driver (died 1927)
7 April – C. H. Dodd, theologian (died 1973)
12 April – Tenby Davies, half-mile world champion runner (died 1932)
20 June – John Dyke, Wales international rugby union player (died 1960)
31 July – Lionel Rees, aviator, recipient of the Victoria Cross (died 1955)
15 August – Ivor Morgan, Wales international rugby union player (died 1943)
21 August – John Chandless, cricketer (died 1968)
24 November – Jack Jones, novelist (died 1970)
3 December – Bailey Davies, Wales international rugby union player (died 1968)
14 December – Margaret Davies, patron of the arts (died 1963)
15 December – Florrie Evans, revivalist and missionary (died 1967)
date unknown – Thomas Jones, footballer (died 1958)

Deaths
12 February – Henry Morgan-Clifford, politician, 77
17 March – Edward Lloyd-Mostyn, 2nd Baron Mostyn, 89
11 April – Thomas William Davids, nonconformist minister and ecclesiastical historian, 67
24 May – Henry Thomas Edwards, preacher, 46 (suicide)
17 July – Charles James Watkin Williams, judge, doctor and politician, 55
27 August – Dewi Havhesp, poet, 53
6 November – George Vane-Tempest, 5th Marquess of Londonderry, industrialist and owner of Plas Machynlleth, 63
16 December – John Davies, Congregational minister, writer, linguist and poet, 80
20 December – Philip Jacob, Archdeacon of Winchester, 80

References